Vincenty's formulae are two related iterative methods used in geodesy to calculate the distance between two points on the surface of a spheroid, developed by Thaddeus Vincenty (1975a). They are based on the assumption that the figure of the Earth is an oblate spheroid, and hence are more accurate than methods that assume a spherical Earth, such as great-circle distance.

The first (direct) method computes the location of a point that is a given distance and azimuth (direction) from another point. The second (inverse) method computes the geographical distance and azimuth between two given points. They have been widely used in geodesy because they are accurate to within 0.5 mm (0.020in) on the Earth ellipsoid.

Background 

Vincenty's goal was to express existing algorithms for geodesics on an ellipsoid in a form that minimized the program length (Vincenty 1975a). His unpublished report (1975b) mentions the use of a Wang 720 desk calculator, which had only a few kilobytes of memory. To obtain good accuracy for long lines, the solution uses the classical solution of Legendre (1806), Bessel (1825), and Helmert (1880) based on the auxiliary sphere. Vincenty relied on formulation of this method given by Rainsford, 1955. Legendre showed that an ellipsoidal geodesic can be exactly mapped to a great circle on the auxiliary sphere by mapping the geographic latitude to reduced latitude and setting the azimuth of the great circle equal to that of the geodesic. The longitude on the ellipsoid and the distance along the geodesic are then given in terms of the longitude on the sphere and the arc length along the great circle by simple integrals. Bessel and Helmert gave rapidly converging series for these integrals, which allow the geodesic to be computed with arbitrary accuracy.

This resulted in compact expressions for the longitude and distance integrals. The expressions were put in Horner (or nested) form, since this allows polynomials to be evaluated using only a single temporary register. Finally, simple iterative techniques were used to solve the implicit equations in the direct and inverse methods; even though these are slow (and in the case of the inverse method it sometimes does not converge), they result in the least increase in code size.

Notation 
Define the following notation:

Inverse problem
Given the coordinates of the two points (Φ1, L1) and (Φ2, L2), the inverse problem finds the azimuths α1, α2 and the ellipsoidal distance s.

Calculate U1, U2 and L, and set initial value of λ = L. Then iteratively evaluate the following equations until λ converges:

 
 
 
 
 
 
 

When λ has converged to the desired degree of accuracy (10−12 corresponds to approximately 0.06mm), evaluate the following:

 

Between two nearly antipodal points, the iterative formula may fail to converge; this will occur when the first guess at λ as computed by the equation above is greater than π in absolute value.

Direct problem
Given an initial point (Φ1, L1) and initial azimuth, α1, and a distance, s, along the geodesic the problem is to find the end point (Φ2, L2) and azimuth, α2.

Start by calculating the following:

 

Then, using an initial value , iterate the following equations until there is no significant change in σ:

Once σ is obtained to sufficient accuracy evaluate:

 

If the initial point is at the North or South pole, then the first equation is indeterminate. If the initial azimuth is due East or West, then the second equation is indeterminate. If a double valued atan2 type function is used, then these values are usually handled correctly.

Vincenty's modification

In his letter to Survey Review in 1976, Vincenty suggested replacing his series expressions for A and B with simpler formulas using Helmert's expansion parameter k1:

 
 

where

Nearly antipodal points

As noted above, the iterative solution to the inverse problem fails to converge or converges slowly for nearly antipodal points. An example of slow convergence is (Φ1, L1) = (0°, 0°) and (Φ2, L2) = (0.5°, 179.5°) for the WGS84 ellipsoid. This requires about 130 iterations to give a result accurate to 1 mm. Depending on how the inverse method is implemented, the algorithm might return the correct result (19936288.579 m), an incorrect result, or an error indicator. An example of an incorrect result is provided by the NGS online utility, which returns a distance that is about 5 km too long. Vincenty suggested a method of accelerating the convergence in such cases (Rapp, 1993).

An example of a failure of the inverse method to converge is (Φ1, L1) = (0°, 0°) and (Φ2, L2) = (0.5°, 179.7°) for the WGS84 ellipsoid. In an unpublished report, Vincenty (1975b) gave an alternative iterative scheme to handle such cases. This converges to the correct result 19944127.421 m after about 60 iterations; however, in other cases many thousands of iterations are required.

Karney (2013) reformulated the inverse problem as a one-dimensional root-finding problem; this can be rapidly solved with Newton's method for all pairs of input points.

See also
Geographical distance
Great-circle distance
Meridian arc
Geodesics on an ellipsoid
Thaddeus Vincenty
Geodesy

Notes

References

  English translation of Astron. Nachr. 4, 241–254 (1825).
   English translation of Die Mathematischen und Physikalischen Theorieen der Höheren Geodäsie, Vol. 1 (Teubner, Leipzig, 1880).
  Addenda.

External links
 Online calculators from Geoscience Australia:
 Vincenty Direct (destination point)
 Vincenty Inverse (distance between points)
 Calculators from the U.S. National Geodetic Survey:
 Online and downloadable PC-executable calculation utilities, including forward (direct) and inverse problems, in both two and three dimensions (accessed 2011-08-01).
 Online calculators with JavaScript source code by Chris Veness (Creative Commons Attribution license):
 Vincenty Direct (destination point)
 Vincenty Inverse (distance between points)
 GeographicLib provides a utility GeodSolve (with MIT/X11 licensed source code) for solving direct and inverse geodesic problems. Compared to Vincenty, this is about 1000 times more accurate (error = 15 nm) and the inverse solution is complete. Here is an online version of GeodSolve.
 Complete Vincenty's direct and inverse formulae implementation with source code, Excel VBA implementation by Tomasz Jastrzębski

Geodesy
Distance